Forever Lost may refer to:

 "Forever Lost" (song), the debut single by rock band The Magic Numbers
 Forever Lost (album), a 2012 album by Norwegian recording artist A-Lee
 "Forever Lost", a song by God Is an Astronaut on the album All Is Violent, All Is Bright
 "Forever Lost", a song by Sentenced on the album Amok